Petre is a surname and given name derived from Peter. Notable persons with that name include:

People with the given name Petre

 Charles Petre Eyre (1817–1902), English Roman Catholic prelate
 Ion Petre Stoican (circa 1930–1990), Romanian violinist
 Marian Petre Miluț (born 1955), Romanian politician, engineer and businessman
 Petre Andrei (1891–1940), Romanian sociologist
 Petre Antonescu (1873–1965), Romanian architect
 Petre S. Aurelian (1833–1909), Romanian politician
 Petre Cameniță (1889–1962), Romanian general during World War II
 Petre P. Carp (1837–1919), Romanian conservative politician and literary critic
 Petre Crowder (1919–1999), British Conservative politician and barrister
 Petre Dulfu (1856–1953), Romanian poet
 Petre Dumitrescu (1882–1950), Romanian general during World War II
 Petre Gruzinsky (1920–1984), Georgian poet
 Petre Ispirescu (1830–1887), Romanian printer and publicist
 Petre Mais (1885–1975), English writer and broadcaster
 Petre Marin (born 1973), Romanian footballer
 Petre Mavrogheni (1819–1887), Romanian politician
 Petre Mitu (born 1977), former Romanian rugby union footballer
 Petre Nicolae (21st century), Romanian actor
 Petre Popeangă (born 1944), Romanian politician
 Petre Roman (born 1946), Romanian politician
 Petre Stoica (1931–2009), Romanian poet
 Petre Tobă (born 1964), Romanian politician
 Petre Tsiskarishvili (born 1974), Georgian politician
 Petre Țuțea (1902–1991), Romanian philosopher

People with the surname Petre
Benjamin Petre (1672–1758), English Roman Catholic prelate
Bernard Henry Philip Petre, 14th Baron Petre (1858–1908), husband of Etheldreda Mary Clark
Ciprian Petre (born 1980), Romanian football player
Cristian Petre (born 1979), Romanian rugby union player
Dorotheea Petre (born 1981), Romanian actress
Sir Edward Petre, 3rd Baronet (1631–1699), English Jesuit and privy councillor
Esthera Petre (born 1990), Romanian high jumper
Florentin Petre (born 1976), Romanian footballer
Sir George Petre (1822–1905), British diplomat
Francis Petre (1847–1918), prominent New Zealand-born architect
Francis Loraine Petre (1852–1918), British military historian
Henry Petre (1884–1962), Australia's first military aviator
Henry William Petre (1820–1889), member of the New Zealand Legislative Council
John Petre, 1st Baron Petre (1549–1613), Lord-Lieutenant of Essex
John Petre, 18th Baron Petre (born 1942), Lord-Lieutenant of Essex
Kay Petre (1903–1994), Canadian-British motor racing star
Maria Petre (born 1951), Romanian politician and economist
Marian Petre (born 1959), British computer scientist
Maude Petre (1863–1942), British Roman Catholic nun, writer and critic
Ovidiu Petre (born 1982), Romanian football player
William Petre (1505–1572), public servant
William Petre, 4th Baron Petre (1626–1684), victim of the Popish Plot

See also

 Baron Petre
 Peter (disambiguation)
 Petr (disambiguation)
 Petra (disambiguation)
 Petre Bay
 Petri (disambiguation)
 Petro (disambiguation)
 Petru
 Turville-Petre
 Petreni (disambiguation)
 Petrești (disambiguation)
 Petreasa (disambiguation)
 Whanganui, a city in New Zealand originally called Petre

English-language surnames
Georgian masculine given names
Romanian masculine given names
Romanian-language surnames